Ray Lampkin (born 1948  in Portland, Oregon) is a retired professional boxer who lost a 1975 World Boxing Association (WBA) lightweight title fight against Roberto Durán in Panama. Lampkin lasted fourteen rounds against the hard-hitting Duran. He won the North American Boxing Federation lightweight title fight but later lost it against Esteban de Jesús at the Felt Forum in New York City. He finished his career with a total of 34 wins (16 by knock out), six losses (two by knock out) and one draw. Lampkin was inducted into the Oregon Sports Hall of Fame.

References

Living people
Boxers from Portland, Oregon
1948 births
American male boxers
African Americans in Oregon
Lightweight boxers